The Central Philippine University Church (officially University Church, Central Philippine University), commonly referred as University Church, UC or CPU Church, is a Protestant church located on the campus of the Central Philippine University in Jaro District, Iloilo City, Philippines. Founded in 1913 by the missionaries under the auspices of the American Baptist Foreign Mission Society, the present church structure was built and completed in 1970 under the  chaplaincy of Kenneth Losh, an American Baptist missionary. The church which is notable for its Malay architectural style, is a famous landmark in Iloilo City.

A distinct unit of the university, it is independent from it and is a member of the Convention of Philippine Baptist Churches (CPBC), the oldest Baptist churches union in the Philippines.

The church seats almost 1,000 people. A denominational church, it hosts Sunday and mid-week Congregational Christian Protestant worship services. It functions also as a venue for several annual special events and convocations such as baccalaureate services, hooding ceremonies, health sciences ceremonies (nursing candle lighting, pinning and capping), and commencement exercises of the university's colleges and schools of graduate studies, law and medicine.

Gallery

External links
 Central Philippine University Church website

Central Philippine University
Protestantism in the Philippines
History of the Philippines (1898–1946)
Buildings and structures in Iloilo City
Churches in Iloilo